The Boy Rider is a 1927 American silent Western film directed by Louis King and starring Buzz Barton, Lorraine Eason and Sam Nelson.

Cast
 Buzz Barton as David Hepner 
 Lorraine Eason as Sally Parker 
 Sam Nelson as Terry McNeil 
 David Dunbar as Bill Hargus 
 Frank Rice as Hank Robbins 
 William Ryno as Jim Parker

References

External links
 

1927 films
1927 Western (genre) films
American black-and-white films
Films directed by Louis King
Film Booking Offices of America films
Silent American Western (genre) films
1920s English-language films
1920s American films